Bahrain competed at the 2016 Summer Olympics in Rio de Janeiro, Brazil, from 5 to 21 August 2016. This nation marked its ninth consecutive appearance at the Summer Olympics.

The Bahrain Olympic Committee fielded a team of 35 athletes, 21 men and 14 women, across four different sports at the Games. It was the nation's largest ever delegation sent to the Olympics, roughly a triple of its full roster size at any edition since it debuted in 1984. Among the sports represented by the nation's athletes, Bahrain marked its Olympic debut in wrestling. More than fifty percent of the nation's roster were born outside Bahrain; majority of its athletes hailed from select African countries, particularly in Nigeria, Ethiopia, and Kenya.

Notable Bahraini athletes featured sprinters Abubakar Abbas and Ali Khamis in the men's 400 metres, London 2012 Olympians Mimi Belete and Shitaye Eshete (both came from Ethiopia), Kenyan-born marathon runner and 2015 world bronze medalist Eunice Kirwa, Jamaican-born sprinters Kemarley Brown and Andrew Fisher, Russian-born freestyle wrestler Adam Batirov, and freestyle swimmer Farhan Saleh, who eventually carried the nation's flag at the opening ceremony, the first by a male since 2004.

Bahrain left Rio de Janeiro with two medals (one gold and one silver), signifying its most successful outcome in Olympic history. These medals were awarded to Bahrain's first ever Olympic champion Ruth Jebet in the women's 3000 m steeplechase, and Kirwa, who earned a silver in the women's marathon.

Medalists

Athletics
 
Bahraini athletes have so far achieved qualifying standards in the following athletics events (up to a maximum of 3 athletes in each event): The track and field team was named on May 11, 2016, including track star Abubakar Abbas, 2014 Asian Games champion Kemi Adekoya, and two-time silver medalist Mimi Belete.

Track & road events
Men

Women

Shooting
 
Bahrain has received an invitation from ISSF to send Mahmood Haji in the men's rifle events to the Olympics.

Qualification Legend: Q = Qualify for the next round; q = Qualify for the bronze medal (shotgun)

Swimming

Bahrain has received a Universality invitation from FINA to send two swimmers (one male and one female) to the Olympics.

Wrestling

Bahrain has qualified one wrestler for the men's freestyle 65 kg into the Olympic competition as a result of his semifinal triumph at the initial meet of the World Qualification Tournament in Istanbul, signifying the nation's debut in the sport.

Men's freestyle

References

External links 

 

Nations at the 2016 Summer Olympics
2016
2016 in Bahraini sport